Saint Zoe of Rome (died ) was a noblewoman, married to Nicostratus, a high Roman court official.

For six years she had been unable to speak. Saint Sebastian made the sign of the cross over the woman, and she immediately began to speak and she glorified Jesus. Nicostratus and his wife asked for baptism. She lived during the reign of Emperor Diocletian and his early persecution of Christians.

She was greatly devoted to Saint Peter, and was discovered praying by his tomb when she was arrested for her faith. She died, stifled by smoke, hung over a fire. Her body then was thrown into the River Tiber.

She is considered a saint in the Roman Catholic and Eastern Orthodox Churches.

References

3rd-century Christian martyrs
Year of birth unknown
Ante-Nicene Christian female saints
Christians martyred during the reign of Diocletian